Xaloztoc (municipality) is a municipality in Tlaxcala in south-eastern Mexico. It is one of 60 municipalities in the state, and serves as the capital of Tlaxcala. The INEGI reference number for the municipality is 29039.

Geography
As of 2010, Xaloztoc has an estimated 21,769 residents. The size of the municipality is about 49 km2 (19 sq mi). The average elevation is 2,500 meters (8,200 ft) above sea level.

Climate
On average, Xaloztoc receives 730.3 mm/m2 (28.8 in) of precipitation annually.

References

Municipalities of Tlaxcala